Systems Plus College Foundation (SPCF) is a private, non-Sectarian basic and higher education institution in Angeles, Pampanga, Philippines.

History

On June 27, 1985 at Santa Isabel Building in Balibago, Angeles, five person came together and formed Systems Plus Inc. (SPI). The primary purpose of forming this organization was to conduct seminars for those who were planning to enter the electronic data processing as programmers, encoders and system analysts.

Tutorial programs for students and professionals started at the institution on July 7, 1985. This date also served as the school's foundation day.

In subsequent years, Systems Plus Inc. saw increased enrollment. In June 1987, the institution started offering associate courses and later on, bachelor's degree and graduate degree programs.

The growth of the school has been outstanding. Recent times has seen it open four campuses in Cubao, Caloocan, San Fernando and in Miranda, Angeles.

San Fernando Campus

A few years later, another campus in the San Fernando, Pampanga was opened to accommodate the fast growing student population.

In June 2004,the name of the school was once again changed from Systems Plus Computer College to Systems Plus College Foundation (SPCF), Inc. with the adoption of a new school logo. This was to align itself with the expected growth and development,

The Commission on Higher Education Regional Office has awarded the Center of Development in Information Technology designation to the school. It has been continuously producing graduates who are service-oriented, responsive to the needs of the industries, innovative and active participants in the shaping of our country's future.

References

External links
SPCF website

Universities and colleges in Angeles City
Nursing schools in the Philippines